Moshing (also known as slam dancing or simply slamming) is an extreme style of dancing in which participants push or slam into each other, typically performed to "aggressive" live music such as heavy metal and punk rock. Moshing usually happens in the center of the crowd, generally closer to the stage, in an area called the "mosh pit". It is intended to be energetic and full of body contact.

The dance style originated in the hardcore punk scenes of California and Washington, D.C., around 1980. Through the 1980s it spread to other branches of punk rock as well as grunge and thrash metal, which exposed it to the mainstream. Since then, moshing has occasionally been performed to energetic music within a wide variety of genres, including alternative rock, electronic dance music and hip hop, while remaining a staple in heavy metal shows.

Variations of moshing exist, including "pogoing", "circle pits", and "wall of death". Dancing can be done alone as well as in groups.

While moshing is seen as a form of positive fan feedback or expression of enjoyment, it has also drawn criticism over dangerous excesses in its violence. Injuries and even deaths have been reported in the crush of mosh pits.

History

Etymology

The term mosh came into use in the early 1980s American hardcore scene in Washington, D.C. Early on, the dance was frequently spelled mash in fanzines and record liner notes, but pronounced mosh, as in the 1982 song "Total Mash" by the D.C.-based hardcore band Scream. H.R. of the band Bad Brains, regarded as a band that "put moshing on the map," used the term mash in lyrics and in concert stage banter to both incite and to describe the aggressive and often violent dancing of the scene. To "mash it up" was to go wild with the frenzy of the music. Due to his Jamaican-accented pronunciation of the word, fans heard this as mosh instead.

By the mid-1980s, the term was appearing in print with its current spelling. By the time thrash metal band Anthrax used the term in their song "Caught in a Mosh", the word was already a mainstay of hardcore and thrash scenes. Scott Ian and Charlie Benante of Anthrax and Stormtroopers of Death have both been credited with the term originating from Vinnie Stigma of the New York hardcore band Agnostic Front. Through the mainstream success of bands like Anthrax, Stormtroopers of Death, and multiple thrash metal bands in the late 1980s, the term came into the popular vernacular.

Origins

The first dance identifiable as moshing may have originated in Orange County, California, during the first wave of American hardcore. Examples of this early moshing can be seen in the documentaries Another State of Mind, Urban Struggle, The Decline of Western Civilization, and American Hardcore, as well as footage from the shows of the era. Dave Wood, an avid concert-goer and roadie of The Weirdos, popularized moshing at a show at The Roxy in 1977. At the time, California hardcore punk bands such as Black Flag and Fear were becoming popular in Orange County. Jerry Roach's club, the Cuckoo's Nest in Costa Mesa, was known as the "birthplace of slam dancing". Fear's 1981 musical performance on Saturday Night Live also helped to expose moshing to a much wider audience.

Crossover into mainstream genres
By the end of the 1980s, the initial wave of American hardcore punk had waned and split into other subgenres. The Seattle-based grunge movement was among the many styles of music that directly evolved from hardcore. Through the mainstream success of several grunge bands, the word mosh entered the popular North American vocabulary and the dance spread to many other music genres. According to John Linnell of They Might Be Giants, "it didn’t matter what kind of music you were playing or what kind of band you were; everybody moshed to everything. It was just kind of the enforced rule of going to concerts."

Variations 
The pogo was the first form of moshing. According to The Filth and the Fury, it was invented by Sex Pistols bassist Sid Vicious in 1976.

A circle pit is a form of moshing in which participants run in a circular motion around the edges of the pit, often leaving an open space in the centre.

A wall of death is a form of moshing which sees the audience divide down the middle into two halves either side of the venue, before each side runs towards the other, slamming the two sides together. According to Noisecreep, the consensus is that it was invented by American hardcore punk band Sick of it All. However, the band's vocalist Lou Koller has stated that he merely revived the practice in 1996, as he often saw a similar act performed in the 1980s New York hardcore scene. Loudwire senior writer Graham Hartmann referred to it as "Perhaps the most bad ass and dangerous ritual you can experience in a mosh pit". Venues will often ask bands not to organize the Wall of Death themselves due to the inherent risk involved and liability.

Hardcore dancing is a term that covers multiple style of moshing including windmilling two stepping, floorpunching, picking up pennies, axehandling, bucking, and wheelbarrowing. The practice began in New York City in the 1980s.

Crowd killing is when a mosher moshes against the crowd around the sides of the pit. According to Kerrang! writer Amanda van Poznak it is generally looked down upon.

Physical properties of emergent behavior 

Researchers from Cornell University studied the emergent behavior of crowds at mosh pits by analyzing online videos, finding similarities with models of 2-D gases in equilibrium. Simulating the crowds with computer models, they found out that a simulation dominated by flocking parameters produced highly ordered behavior, forming vortices like those seen in the videos.

Opposition, criticism and controversy

The American post-hardcore band Fugazi opposed slamdancing at their live shows. Members of Fugazi were reported to single out and confront specific members of the audience, politely asking them to stop hurting other audience members, or hauling them on stage to apologize on the microphone.

Consolidated, an industrial dance group of the 1990s, stood against moshing. On their third album, Play More Music, they included the song "The Men's Movement", which proclaimed the inappropriate nature of slamdancing. The song consisted of audio recordings during concerts from the audience and members of Consolidated, arguing about moshing.

In the 1990s, the Smashing Pumpkins took a stance against moshing, following two incidents which resulted in fatalities. At a 1996 Pumpkins concert in Dublin, Ireland, 17-year-old Bernadette O'Brien was crushed by moshing crowd members and later died in the hospital, despite warnings from the band that people were getting hurt. At another concert, singer Billy Corgan said to the audience:

Another fan died at a Smashing Pumpkins concert in Vancouver, British Columbia, Canada, on September 24, 2007. The 20-year-old male was dragged out of the mosh pit, unconscious, to be pronounced dead at a hospital after first-aid specialists attempted to save him.

Reel Big Fish's 1998 album Why Do They Rock So Hard? included their mosh-criticizing song "Thank You for Not Moshing", which contained lyrics that suggested that at least some individuals in the mosh pit were simply bullies who were finding conformity in the violence.

Mike Portnoy, founder and ex-drummer of Dream Theater, and Avenged Sevenfold where he briefly filled in after the death of The Rev, criticized moshing in an interview published on his website:

Sixteen-year-old Jessica Michalik was an Australian girl who died as a result of asphyxiation after being crushed in a mosh pit during the 2001 Big Day Out festival during a performance by nu metal band Limp Bizkit. At that same festival, post-hardcore band At The Drive-In ended their set early after only three songs due to the audience's moshing.

Groove metal group Five Finger Death Punch had an incident when, during the song "White Knuckles" at a concert in Hartford, Connecticut, a young man received a compound fracture on his ankle in a mosh pit. Ivan Moody, the band's lead singer, stopped the show, leaped into the crowd with Zoltan Bathory, the band's rhythm guitarist, and carried the injured fan onto the stage, from where he was taken to the hospital. Moody has been quoted as saying: "I looked him square in the face and asked him if he was okay, or if there was anything I could do for him. He looked over at me, still in shock, and said 'You guys fucking rock!
Moody stated "I've felt bad because of what has happened. I miss the old Pantera kids who would just throw each other. Just respect other people; come on."  Bathory stated: "Because he broke his leg I threw down my guitar. We just finished when he broke his leg, and I came out and I stayed with him until the paramedics picked him up. These are my people and that's how it is."

Joey DeMaio of American heavy metal band Manowar has been known to temporarily stop concerts upon seeing moshing and crowd surfing, claiming it is dangerous to other fans.

Former Slipknot percussionist Chris Fehn spoke about the state of audience interaction following the onstage incident and subsequent legal issues involving Lamb of God’s Randy Blythe, who was eventually found not guilty of criminal wrongdoing in the death of a concertgoer, despite being held "morally responsible". Fehn briefly addressed the Blythe situation, stating "I think, especially in America, moshing has turned into a form of bullying. The big guy stands in the middle and just trucks any small kid that comes near him. They don’t mosh properly anymore. It sucks because that’s not what it’s about. Those guys need to be kicked out. A proper mosh pit is a great way to be as a group and dance, and just do your thing."

See also
 Headbanging
 Crowd surfing
 Skank (dance)
 Stage diving
 Praisepit, a colloquial name given to a mosh pit which occurs at a Pentecostal Christian church service

References

External links
 MTV: The Social History of the Mosh Pit (2002)
 How to Mosh in a Mosh Pit on wikiHow (detailed listing of steps to follow, tips, and warnings)
 "Crowd Surfing and Moshing" at Safeconcerts (includes information on injuries sustained)

Syllabus-free dance
Heavy metal subculture
Punk
Hardcore punk
Grunge
Articles containing video clips
Thrash metal
Hardcore hip hop
Hardcore (electronic dance music genre)